Soul'd Out (usually styled as SOUL'd OUT) was a Japanese hip-hop trio, consisting of Diggy-MO' (MC), Bro.Hi (MC/Human Beat Box), and Shinnosuke (DJ). Their name is a portmanteau of "soul" and "sold out", and the group is sometimes referred to by their initials, S.O.  On 30 January 2014, the group announced on Facebook that they would disband after their final album, To From, was released on 9 April 2014.

Members

Diggy-MO'
Diggy-MO', the group's lead MC, was classically trained on piano, before forming a hip-hop group in middle school. He attended a university of fine arts, majoring in graphics, but continued making music. In SOUL'd OUT, he co-wrote the lyrics with Bro.Hi, and composed and arranged a number the band's tracks. He often sings as well as rapping, particularly in his solo material, which is less hip-hop oriented than SOUL'd OUT's work.

He launched his first solo single, "Bakusou Yume Uta", on 26 November 2008. The track was used as the third ending theme of the anime Soul Eater. His debut solo album, Diggyism, was released on 25 March 2009. His last solo single before rejoining SOUL'd OUT was "Stay Beautiful", released on 12 May 2010 and used as the 23rd ending theme of the anime series Bleach. The follow-up album, Diggyism II, was released on 7 July 2010.

Bro.Hi
Bro.Hi was the beatboxer and MC for the group, also co-writing the lyrics. He had previously played drums in a band while at middle school, but became interested in human beatboxing after seeing The Roots.

Bro.Hi also formed a rock group, EdgePlayer, with fellow DJ and rapper Kay. Their debut mini-album was called In Humanity, followed by first single "Nagarete" on 2 September 2009, and second album, Twisted, on 21 July 2010.

Shinnosuke
Shinnosuke was the DJ for Soul'd Out, co-writing the group's music with Diggy-Mo and contributing to the arrangement as a producer. He released a self-titled solo album under the name S'capade on 6 June 2010.

Discography

Albums
Soul'd Out - released 27 August 2003
Movies & Remixies - released 10 December 2003
CD/DVD compilation of remixes and music videos
To All Tha Dreamers - released 2 February 2005
Second closing theme for anime series Yakitate!! Japan
 - released 20 April 2005
Movies & Remixies 2 - released 18 May 2005
Alive - released 8 March 2006
vinyl selection from Alive including one exclusive track
Remixies & Outside - released 21 June 2006
Pop'n Top - released 21 June 2006
vinyl selection of songs and remixes from Alive
Single Collection - released 27 December 2006
Attitude - released 23 January 2008
Flip Side Collection - released 5 March 2008
B-sides compilation. Includes B-sides from singles like "Wekapipo," "To All Tha Dreamers," and "Starlight Destiny" for a total of 15 tracks
Movies & Remixies 4 - released 30 July 2008
 CD includes remixed tracks from their 4th album "Attitude". DVD covers all 5 PVs from "Starlight Destiny" to "Cozmic Travel".
so mania - released 29 August 2012
Decade - released 23 January 2013 - A best of 2-disc album, including one new track "TooTsie pOp" 
To From - released 9 April 2014 - This is to be their last album before disbanding.

Singles
 - released 22 January 2003
"Flyte Tyme" - released 9 April 2003
"Dream Drive"/"Shut Out" - released 9 July 2003
"Love, Peace & Soul" - released 19 November 2003
"1,000,000 Monsters Attack" - released 21 April 2004, This song also appeared on the soundtrack of FIFA Football 2005.
"Magenta Magenta" - released 14 July 2004
"Blues" - released 3 November 2004
"To All Tha Dreamers" - released 1 January 2005, Ending to the anime Yakitate!! Japan
 - released 31 August 2005
"Alive" - released 7 December 2005
 - released 8 February 2006
"Catwalk" - released 26 April 2006
"Starlight Destiny" - released 27 September 2006
"Grown Kidz/Voodoo Kingdom" - released 21 February 2007, Voodoo Kingdom appeared in the theatrical film JoJo's Bizarre Adventure: Phantom Blood.
"Megalopolis Patrol" - released 5 September 2007, This song is used as the Opening Theme of the Japanese version of The Boondocks.
"Tongue Te Tongue" - released 3 October 2007, The 2nd of the 3 month continual releases.
"Cozmic Travel" - released 28 November 2007, 3rd featured single of continual releases.
"and 7" - released 27 April 2011
"superfeel" - released 25 April 2012
"Singin' my Lu" - released 1 August 2012, Ending to the anime Uta Koi

Videos
Tour 2003 "Dream'd Live" - released 25 February 2004
Tour 2005 "To All Tha Dreamers" - released 14 September 2005
Tour 2007 "Single Collection" Live at Nihon Budokan - released 18 July 2007
Tour 2008 "Attitude" - released 30 July 2008
Held on April 23, 2008, in JCB Hall, Tokyo Dome City, the Live DVD covers the final performance from their Japan tour 「Tour 2008 "Attitude"」.

References

External links
Official Facebook
Official Website

Sony Music Entertainment Japan artists
Japanese hip hop groups
Japanese pop music groups